{{DISPLAYTITLE:7beta-hydroxysteroid dehydrogenase (NADP+)}}

In enzymology, a 7beta-hydroxysteroid dehydrogenase (NADP+) is an enzyme that catalyzes the chemical reaction

a 7beta-hydroxysteroid + NADP+  a 7-oxosteroid + NADPH + H+

Thus, the two substrates of this enzyme are 7beta-hydroxysteroid and NADP+, whereas its 3 products are 7-oxosteroid, NADPH, and H+.

This enzyme belongs to the family of oxidoreductases, specifically those acting on the CH-OH group of donor with NAD+ or NADP+ as acceptor. The systematic name of this enzyme class is 7beta-hydroxysteroid:NADP+ 7-oxidoreductase. Other names in common use include NADP+-dependent 7beta-hydroxysteroid dehydrogenase, and 7beta-hydroxysteroid dehydrogenase (NADP+).

References 

 
 
 
 

EC 1.1.1
NADPH-dependent enzymes
Enzymes of unknown structure